Charun was a god in Etruscan mythology.

Charun may also refer to
Places
Charun, Chitral, a village in Pakistan
Charun, Iran
People
Baljit Singh Charun (born 1986), hockey-player from Malaysia
César Charún (born 1970), Peruvian footballer
Fictional Characters
Charun Krojib, a character in Hiveswap

See also 
Charon (disambiguation)